Admaston may refer to:
Admaston, Ontario, Canada
Admaston Bromley, Ontario, Canada
Admaston, Shropshire, England, UK
Admaston, Staffordshire, England, UK